Macroglenes is a genus of pteromalids in the family Pteromalidae. There are at least 20 described species in Macroglenes.

Species
These 22 species belong to the genus Macroglenes:

 Macroglenes bouceki (Graham, 1969) c g
 Macroglenes brevicornis (Nees, 1834) c g
 Macroglenes caudatus Mitroiu, 2010 g
 Macroglenes chalybeus (Haliday, 1833) c g
 Macroglenes clypeatus (Girault, 1925) c g
 Macroglenes compressus (Forster, 1841) g
 Macroglenes congener (Girault, 1925) c g
 Macroglenes conjungens (Graham, 1969) c g
 Macroglenes decipiens (Graham, 1969) g
 Macroglenes eximius (Haliday, 1833) c g
 Macroglenes gramineus (Haliday, 1833) c g
 Macroglenes herbaceus (Graham, 1969) c g
 Macroglenes ipswichi (Girault, 1925) c g
 Macroglenes marylandicus (Girault, 1916) c g
 Macroglenes microcerus Haliday, 1844 c g
 Macroglenes nigroclypeatus Amerling & Kirchner, 1860 c g
 Macroglenes paludum (Graham, 1969) c g
 Macroglenes penetrans (Kirby, 1800) c g
 Macroglenes sivani Narendran & Sureshan, 2004 c g
 Macroglenes varicornis (Haliday, 1833) c g
 Macroglenes yuasai Ishii g
 Macroglenes zdeneki Mitroiu, 2010 g

Data sources: i = ITIS, c = Catalogue of Life, g = GBIF, b = Bugguide.net

References

Further reading

External links

 

Pteromalidae